Kaikeri  is a village in the southern state of Karnataka, India. It is located in the Virajpet taluk of Kodagu district.

Demographics
 India census, Kaikeri had a population of 5176 with 2619 males and 2557 females.

See also
 Kodagu
 Districts of Karnataka

References

External links
 http://Kodagu.nic.in/

Villages in Kodagu district